This is a list of currently active separatist movements in Oceania. Separatism includes autonomism and secessionism. What is and is not considered an autonomist or secessionist movement is sometimes contentious. Entries on this list must meet three criteria:
They are active movements with living, active members.
They are seeking greater autonomy or self-determination for a geographic region (as opposed to personal autonomy).
They are the citizen/peoples of the contested area.

Under each region listed is one or more of the following
De facto state: for regions with de facto autonomy from the government
Proposed state: proposed name for a seceding sovereign state
Proposed autonomous area: for movements toward greater autonomy for an area but not outright secession
De facto autonomous government: for governments with de facto autonomous control over a region
Government-in-exile: for a government based outside of the region in question, with or without control
Political party (or parties): for political parties involved in a political system to push for autonomy or secession
Militant organisation(s): for armed organisations
Advocacy group(s): for non-belligerent, non-politically participatory entities
Ethnic/ethno-religious/racial/regional/religious group(s)

Australia

 Aboriginal Australians
 Ethnic group: Aboriginal Australians
 Proposed state or autonomous area:  Murrawarri Republic, Sovereign Yidindji Government, various other 
 Pressure groups: Aboriginal Tent Embassy, Murrawarri Republic

 Ethnic group: Norfolk Islanders
Proposed autonomous area: Norfolk Island as an autonomous region of Australia or free association with New Zealand
 Pressure groups: Norfolk Island Party
 Torres Strait Islands
 Ethnic group: Torres Strait Islanders
 Proposed state or autonomous area: Torres Strait Islands

Proposed state: Western Australia
Political party: WAxit Party

Proposed state: Tasmania
 Pressure groups: First Party of Tasmania

 Proposed state: Victoria
 Advocacy group: Victorian Independence Movement

Chile

 (Easter Island)
Ethnic group: Rapa Nui

Federated States of Micronesia 

People: Chuukese
 Proposed state: Chuuk

France

 Ethnic group: Tahitians
 Political party: Tavini Huiraatira
 Proposed state:  Tahiti or Kingdom of Tahiti
 Marquesas

 Ethnic group: Tahitians
 Proposed State:  Marquesas Independent from  but remaining within the French Republic

 Moorea

 Proposed state: Republic of Hau Pakumotu

 Ethnic groups: Kanaks, Caldoche
 Political parties: Kanak and Socialist National Liberation Front, Caledonian Union, Party of Kanak Liberation, Kanak Socialist Liberation, Labour Party, Federation of Pro-Independence Co-operation Committees, Renewed Caledonian Union
 Proposed state:  New Caledonia or Kanaky

Indonesia

Maluku (province)

 Ethnic group: Moluccans
 Proposed state:  South Moluccas
 Government-in-exile: Republik Maluku Selatan (member of the Unrepresented Nations and Peoples Organization)
 Advocacy group: Maluku Sovereignty Front

Papua

 Ethnic group: Papuans
 Proposed state:  West Papua or unification with  Papua New Guinea
 Government-in-exile: Republic of West Papua (member of the Unrepresented Nations and Peoples Organization)
 Militant organisation: Free Papua Movement
 Advocacy group: United Liberation Movement for West Papua

Kiribati
 Banaba Island
 Proposed state: Banaba
 Initiative: Banabans can vote in Fiji and also in Kiribati, and have a member of parliament in Kiribati; they have sought independence for Banaba, to prevent it being totally absorbed into Kiribati, though most wish to remain in Fiji. In 2006, Teitirake Corrie, the Rabi Island Council's representative to the Parliament of Kiribati, called for Banaba to secede from Kiribati and join Fiji.

New Zealand

 Cook Islands
 Ethnic group: Cook Islanders
 Proposed state:  Cook Islands
 Initiative by the Cook Islands Ariki which considers both the Cook Islands' previous status as a British protectorate and its current status as associated state of New Zealand to be illegitimate. Aims to set up the Cook Islands as a sovereign state independent of both the United Kingdom and New Zealand.

 South Island

 People: South Islanders
Proposed state or autonomus area: South Island OR New Munster Province

Papua New Guinea

Proposed state: Bougainville

 Proposed autonomous province: New Ireland

Solomon Islands 

 Malaita Province

 Proposed state: Malaita

United States

 Ethnic group: Chamorro, Non-Natives 
 Proposed state:  Republic of Guam

Ethnic group: Native Hawaiians, Haoles
Proposed state:   Republic of Hawaii or The Hawaiian Kingdom
Pressure groups: Nation of Hawaiʻi (organization), Office of Hawaiian Affairs, Ka Lāhui Hawaiʻi
Political party: Aloha ʻĀina Party
(The purpose of these organizations and The Hawaiian Sovereignty Movement is to create Native Hawaiian nations within the State of Hawaii equal to Native American nations, or to obtain complete independence from the USA).

Vanuatu

Espiritu Santo
 Ethnic group: Ni-Vanuatu
 Proposed autonomous area:  Vemerana
 Political party: Nagriamel

See also
Lists of active separatist movements
List of historical separatist movements

References

Separatist Movements, Active
Separatist Movements In Oceania, Active
Oceania
Separatist Movements In Oceania, Active